Study for Crouching Nude is a 1952 painting by the Irish-born artist Francis Bacon. It was painted in the Spring of 1952, and shows a perched figure whose form was likely derived from Muybridge's Man Performing a Standing Jump. The painting was first displayed – in place of Study for Portrait (1949) – at Recent Trends in Realist Painting (organized by Robert Melville and David Sylvester) at the Institute of Contemporary Arts, London, from July to August 1952. It is held at the Detroit Institute of Arts.

References

Paintings by Francis Bacon
1952 paintings
Paintings in the collection of the Detroit Institute of Arts